Adolph IX, Count of Holstein-Kiel, also known as Adolph VII, ( – 26 January 1390) was count of Holstein-Kiel and Holstein-Plön from 1359 until his death.

Life 
His parents were John III "the Mild" ( – 27 September 1359) and Catherine (died 1327), the daughter of Duke Henry III of Glogów and the widow of Margrave John V of Brandenburg (1302–1317). In December 1362, Adolph IX married Anna of Mecklenburg-Schwerin (1343–1415), the daughter of Albert II, Duke of Mecklenburg.

Adolph's reign was mostly peaceful. In 1375, Prince-Archbishop Albert II of Bremen mortgaged the Haseldorf Marsh to him. The prince-archbishop of Bremen later failed to redeem the mortgage, and the Haseldorf Marsh has been part of Holstein ever since.

Adolph IX died without an heir on 26 January 1390. After his death, Count Nicholas of Holstein-Rendsburg and his nephews occupied Holstein-Kiel and Holstein-Plön. The Counts of the Holstein-Pinneberg branch of the House of Schauenburg objected and demanded a share of the inheritance. The dispute was settled amicably, with the counts in Pinneberg receiving monetary compensation, plus the district of Nienland (consisting of Neuland and the Lordship of Herzhorn) and some land along the Elbe. The Counts of Holstein-Rendsburg and Holstein-Pinneburg also concluded a treaty of mutual inheritance: if one line were to die out, the other would inherit all their possessions and hereditary fiefs.

Ancestors

References

Footnotes 

Counts of Holstein
House of Schauenburg
1320s births
1390 deaths
Year of birth uncertain